The Bishop of Bristol heads the Church of England Diocese of Bristol in the Province of Canterbury, in England.

The present diocese covers parts of the counties of Somerset and Gloucestershire together with a small area of Wiltshire.  The see is in the City of Bristol where the seat is located at Bristol Cathedral. The bishop's residence is a house in Winterbourne, Gloucestershire, north of Bristol.

The bishop is Vivienne Faull (previously Dean of York), since the confirmation of her election on 25 June 2018. She was consecrated at St Paul's Cathedral on 3 July 2018 and enthroned in her Cathedral Church of the Holy and Undivided Trinity, Bristol on 20 October 2018.

History

Early times
In 1133, Robert Fitzharding began to build "the abbeye at Bristowe, that of Saint Austin is" (i.e. an Augustinian monastery). The abbey church, destined to serve hereafter as a cathedral, was of different dates: the old Norman nave built by Fitzharding seems to have stood till the suppression, but the chancel, which still exists, was early 14th century and the transepts late 15th. The building was worthy to serve as a cathedral. Yet at first Bristol does not seem to have been thought of as a bishopric, for it is not included in the list of projected sees now among the Cottonian MSS in the British Museum.

Tudor period
A suffragan See of Bristol was erected by the Suffragan Bishops Act 1534 and filled by Henry Holbeach, who assisted Hugh Latimer and John Bell, Bishops of Worcester in the Diocese of Worcester while Bristol was still within that diocese. Holbeach was to be the only bishop suffragan before the diocesan See was erected.

The abbey church of the Augustinian Canons was plundered at the time of the suppression of the house in 1539, during the Dissolution of the Monasteries. The church itself was already in process of demolition, when the king's order came to block the devastation. The surviving church's dedication was changed from St Augustine to the Holy Trinity.

It was then decided to establish a diocese of Bristol. This was one of the six that Henry VIII, acting as head of the Church, established by Act of Parliament in 1542 out of the spoils of the suppressed monasteries; the others were Oxford, Westminster, Gloucester, Peterborough, and Chester. Of the six, only Westminster was short-lived (lasting 10 years) – the other five exist today.

It may well be that the fact of the city's then being one of the leading towns in England and the chief seaport explains why it was selected as one of the new sees. Moreover, like the others, it possessed an important religious house, the buildings of which might serve the new purposes. It has also been suggested that the choice of Bristol owed something at least to Thomas Cranmer, who visited Bristol shortly before his election as Archbishop of Canterbury, and busied himself in ecclesiastical affairs there.

The first bishop appointed by the King was Paul Bush, formerly master of  Edington Priory in Wiltshire, an Augustinian canon known as both a scholar and a poet.  He nevertheless went along with the new ways to the point of marrying, his chosen wife being one Edith Ashley.  On this account proceedings were undertaken against him in Queen Mary's reign. In 1554 a commission passed on him a sentence of deprivation, though by this time he had already voluntarily resigned.

During the vacancy, Pope Paul IV empowered Cardinal Pole to re-found the See of Bristol. The next bishop was John Holyman, a former Benedictine monk with a reputation for learning and sanctity who had been a friend of the martyred Abbot of Reading, Hugh Cook Faringdon.  As Bishop of Bristol, Holyman was well appreciated.  Though he took part in the trial of John Hooper, Bishop of Gloucester, and served also on a commission to try Nicholas Ridley and Hugh Latimer, in general he took no active part in the proceedings on the score of heresy.  He died in the summer or autumn of 1558 and was buried in Hanborough, Oxfordshire, the living of which he held from 1534 to 1558—even after his consecration.  He was thus spared the upheaval that began with the accession of Elizabeth I the following November.

No bishop was appointed in Bristol for several years, and then Holyman in 1562 was succeeded by Richard Cheyney (1562–1579), who, though suspect under the new regime on account of his clear Roman leanings (as a young man he was a friend of Edmund Campion), could not be counted a Roman Catholic.

The diocese was formed by taking the county and archdeaconry of Dorset from Salisbury, and several parishes from the dioceses of Gloucester and Worcester, together with three churches in Bristol which had belonged to Bath and Wells.

The modern bishopric
In 1836 the see was united with that of Gloucester, whilst the Dorset territory was reunited with the diocese of Salisbury. In 1897, Bristol was again separated from Gloucester. The new diocese consisted of the southern part of Gloucestershire and the northern part of Wiltshire, including the town of Swindon. Thus the diocese consists of the strip of territory either side of the Great Western railway uniting Swindon and Bristol. The first bishop appointed was George Forrest Browne, Bishop of Bristol from 1897 to 1914.

List of bishops

Assistant bishops

Among those who have served as assistant bishops in the diocese were:
1897–?: Samuel Marsden, Assistant Bishop of Gloucester and former Bishop of Bathurst

References

Sources

 
Whitaker's Almanack (editions 1883 to 2004), Joseph Whitaker & Sons, Ltd/A&C Black, London. Text partly adapted from the Catholic Encyclopaedia'' of 1908.

External links
 Bristol Diocese – Official website

Bristol
Bishops of Bristol
Bristol Cathedral